A nematode infection is a type of helminthiasis caused by organisms in the nematode phylum.

An example is enterobiasis. Several antinematodal agents are available.

References

External links 

Helminthiases
Infection